Castrum Album was an ancient city of Hispania Tarraconensis, mentioned only by Livy. It is generally identified with the ancient settlement of Lucentum (formerly Akra Leuke) in modern Alicante, Spain.

References

Roman sites in Spain
Populated places in Hispania Tarraconensis